Ellen Marijn Hoog (born 26 March 1986) is a former Dutch field hockey player, who is regarded as one of the best Dutch hockey players of her generation.

Field hockey career
Ellen began playing field hockey at the age of seven and in 2002, aged 16 she was selected to play her first senior game for Stichtse Cricket en Hockey Club in Bilthoven and made her debut for the Netherlands women's national field hockey team at age 17 in 2004 and has played in 232 matches, scoring 60 goals. She won Olympic gold medals in 2008 and 2012 and a silver medal in 2016.

In August 2005, she became European champion in Dublin. In December of the same year she won the Champions Trophy in Canberra with the Dutch national women's team. She was a part of the Dutch squad's which won the 2006 Women's Hockey World Cup and the 2014 Women's Hockey World Cup. She was also named as the best player of the 2014 Women's Hockey World Cup.

In 2012, Hoog became the first player to decide a major championship match with a penalty shootout, taking the winning shot in the 2012 Summer Olympics semi-final against New Zealand. She repeated this feat in 2016 when she took the winning shot in the 2016 Summer Olympics semi against Germany.

She retired from international duty in 2016. She then later retired from hockey at her club Amsterdamsche Hockey & Bandy Club in may of 2017.

Style of play
Ellen Hoog is a specialist when it comes to reverse shooting. She is precise and strong when it comes to the forehand shot, she uses this skill to execute the penalty corners. Her offensive speed and ability to change directions so quickly, made her one of the most dangerous midfielders in the world.

Personal life
In August 2015, her book In perfecte conditie (In perfect condition) was published.

Ellen Hoog married her long-term boyfriend in June 2017, after ending her career as a professional. She gave birth to her daughter in February 2019.

Honours
Netherlands women's national field hockey team

Olympic Gold Medal: 2008, 2012
Women's Hockey World Cup: 2006, 2014
Hockey Champions Trophy: 2004, 2005
Women's EuroHockey Championship: 2005, 2009, 2011
Women's FIH Hockey World League: 2012–13

AH&BC

Women's Hoofdklasse Hockey: 2008–09, 2012–13

Individual

Best player of the tournament: 2014 Women's Hockey World Cup
FIH Player of the Year: 2014

References

External links

 Official website
 Ellen Hoog at Ritual Hockey
 

1986 births
Living people
Dutch female field hockey players
Field hockey players at the 2008 Summer Olympics
Field hockey players at the 2012 Summer Olympics
Medalists at the 2008 Summer Olympics
Medalists at the 2012 Summer Olympics
Olympic field hockey players of the Netherlands
Olympic gold medalists for the Netherlands
Olympic medalists in field hockey
People from Bloemendaal
Field hockey players at the 2016 Summer Olympics
Medalists at the 2016 Summer Olympics
Olympic silver medalists for the Netherlands
SCHC players
Amsterdamsche Hockey & Bandy Club players
Sportspeople from North Holland
21st-century Dutch women